Joseph Thompson (born 22 April 2004) known as Joe Thompson is a speedway rider from England.

Speedway career 
Thompson began his speedway career riding for the Leicester Lion Cubs during the 2019 National Development League speedway season. In 2021, he broke into the Leicester Lions senior team for the SGB Championship 2021.

In 2022, he continued to represent Leicester but made his debut for Wolverhampton Wolves (in the highest league in Britain) during the SGB Premiership 2022 season. He helped Leicester dominate the season by winning the league, successfully defending their National League Knockout Cup title (from 2019) and winning the Pairs Championship, partnered by his brother Dan.

In 2023, he signed for Scunthorpe Scorpions for the SGB Championship 2023 following Leicester's move to the Premiership and re-signed for Leicester Lion Cubs for the 2023 National Development League speedway season. Following the injury sustained by Jack Thomas, Thompson was brought into the Ipswich Premiership team as their rising star.

Family
His twin brother Dan Thompson also rides for Leicester Lion Cubs.

References 

Living people
2004 births
British speedway riders
Ipswich Witches riders
Leicester Lions riders
Wolverhampton Wolves riders
Sportspeople from Nuneaton